Charles Berg may refer to:

 Charles Berg (rabbi) (1911–1979), the first non-Orthodox rabbi to be ordained in England
 Charles A. Berg (1927–2014), American farmer and politician
 Charles Arthur Berg (born 1970), American film producer and actor